Bogdan Rzońca (born 1 June 1961 in Zarzecze, Poland) is a Polish politician currently serving as a Member of the European Parliament for the Law and Justice political party.

References

MEPs for Poland 2019–2024
Law and Justice MEPs
Members of the Polish Sejm 2015–2019
Members of the Polish Sejm 2011–2015
Voivodeship marshals of Poland
Podkarpackie Voivodeship
Solidarity Electoral Action politicians
Christian National Union politicians
1961 births
People from Jasło County
Living people